Yutengping railway station is a defunct railway station located in Sanyi Township, Miaoli County, Taiwan. It was located on the Former Mountain line and was operated by Taiwan Railways.

Between June 5–9, 2010, to promote tourism, the Former Mountain Line resumed service between Tai'an and Sanyi station after a twelve-year hiatus, using a steam locomotive numbered CK124. A station was chosen to be built here due to its proximity to the Longteng Bridge. However, due to the slope of the station being too steep, the station was removed in 2011.

References

2010 establishments in Taiwan
2011 disestablishments in Taiwan
Railway stations opened in 2010
Railway stations closed in 2011
Railway stations in Miaoli County